BTA Futsal Almaty Mini-Football Club is a futsal club based in Almaty. The club was founded in 2007 and its pavilion is the Dostyk Sportcomplex with capacity of 1,500 seated spectators.

History
The club was founded in 2007 under the name "BTA Ipoteka". The victory in the first league of Kazakhstan became the first success. In a season of 2011/12, debuted in the championship of Kazakhstan, and at once won bronze medals. Silver medals of the Cup of Kazakhstan in 2011, 2012 were twice won. In September, 2013 it was officially reported about disbandment of "BTA Futsal".

Players

Honours
 Premier League
Bronze (2):  2011-12, 2012-13
 Kazakhstani Futsal Cup 
Finalist (2): 2011, 2012

External links
 BTA Futsal Official Website 

Futsal clubs established in 2007
2007 establishments in Kazakhstan
Futsal clubs in Kazakhstan